Insanity is a Brazilian horror-psychological-thriller streaming television series, produced by Intro Pictures and Star Original Productions for The Walt Disney Company. In Brazil, the series premiered as an original series on December 3, 2021 In Brazil and  January 26, 2022 In Latin America on Star+. In the UK and other selected territories, the series released as an original on January 26, 2022 on Star via Disney+. In India and Southeast Asia, the series released under Select Picks on Disney+ Hotstar on January 26, 2022.

Plot  
Young forensics investigator Paula Costa suffers a nervous breakdown after a personal tragedy and is admitted to a mysterious psychiatric clinic. She is pushed to the limits of her sanity as she investigates the real reason and conspiracy behind her admission to the clinic.

Cast

Main 
 Carol Castro as Paula Costa
 Eucir de Souza as Dr. César Schultz
 Ravel Cabral as Maximiliano Marques Ribeiro
 Rafael Losso as Rafael Gustavo Mello
 Rafaela Mandelli as Camila Garcia
 Samuel de Assis as Lucas Oliveira

Recurring 
 Bella Camero as Lúcia Costa
 Thomás Aquino as Jerônimo
 Pedro Inouê as Chico
 Lourinelson Vladimir as Barcellos
 Fabio Marcoff as Cônsul Almeida
 Leonardo Goulart as Seixas
 Rosana Stavis as Neusa Maurer

Episodes

References

External links 
 

Television shows filmed in Brazil
Television shows filmed in Uruguay
2020s Brazilian television series
2021 Brazilian television series debuts
Portuguese-language television shows
Psychological thriller television series
Brazilian horror fiction television series
Star+ original programming